The World Condemns Them is a 1953 Italian-French melodrama film directed by Gianni Franciolini.

Plot

Cast 

 Alida Valli as Renata Giustini
 Amedeo Nazzari as Paolo Martelli
 Serge Reggiani as André
 Claude Nollier as Maria Martelli
 Franco Interlenghi as Franco 
 Laura Solari as Miss Balestra
 Bianca Doria as Mother of Renata
 Liliana Bonfatti as Nina Swanson

References

External links

1953 films
1953 drama films
Italian drama films
Films directed by Gianni Franciolini
Films about prostitution in Italy
French drama films
French black-and-white films
Italian black-and-white films
1950s Italian films
1950s French films